Mostafa Ghanbarizadeh is an Iranian Football midfielder who currently plays for Iranian football club Pars Jonoubi Jam in the Iran Pro League.

Club career
Ghanbarizadeh joined Esteghlal Khuzestan in summer 2015. He made his debut for them on October 26, 2015 against Esteghlal Ahvaz as a substitute for Hamdollah Ebdam.

Club career statistics

Honours 
Esteghlal Khuzestan
Iran Pro League (1): 2015–16
Iranian Super Cup runner-up: 2016

References

External links
 Mostafa Ghanbarizadeh at IranLeague.ir
 

1995 births
Living people
Iranian footballers
Esteghlal Khuzestan players
Pars Jonoubi Jam players
People from Ahvaz
Association football midfielders
Sportspeople from Khuzestan province